Jagadeesh Prathap Bandari is an Indian actor who prominently works in Telugu films, He made his debut with Avanti Cinema's Nirudyoga Natulu in 2018 and was seen in Raj Rachakonda's Mallesham followed by George Reddy and Palasa 1978. His role as Kesava in the 2021 film Pushpa: The Rise brought him nationwide recognition.

Early life 
Jagadeesh was born and raised in Warangal and he came to Hyderabad in looking for help to finish his first unreleased short film, which eventually made him a regular to the short films screenings at Prasad Labs, and eventually got him a role in Nirudyoga Natulu.

Filmography

Television

Awards and nominations

References

External links

1992 births
Living people
21st-century Indian male writers
21st-century Indian screenwriters
Male actors in Telugu cinema
Telugu male actors
Indian male television actors
Male actors in Telugu television
Indian male film actors
Male actors from Telangana
Indian male screenwriters